Usha Nangiar is an Indian traditional dance performer. Usha performs Nangiarkoothu.

Early life 
Usha was born into a performing family in Kerala. She started at an early age of 10, first practicing Koodiyattam and then branching to Nangiarkoothu. In 1980, Usha joined the Koodiyattam training centre, Ammannur Gurukulam. She was the first girl to join the school.

Publications 
Nangiar has also published a book on Koodiyattam, titled Abhinethri.

Awards
 2014 – Kerala Sangeetha Nataka Akademi Award

References 

Performers of Indian classical dance
Indian female classical dancers
Recipients of the Kerala Sangeetha Nataka Akademi Award